The 1924–25 İstanbul Football League season was the 18th season of the league. Galatasaray SK won the league for the 7th time. The tournament was single-elimination, not league as in the past.

Season

Semifinals

Final

Participated teams
Haliç, Fazilet, İkbaliye, Ortaköy SK, Beykozspor, Yıldız, Bakırköy, Fenerbahçe SK, Altınordu İdman Yurdu SK, Galatasaray SK, Vefa SK, Hilal SK, Küçükçekmece SK, Beşiktaş JK, Beylerbeyi SK, Üsküdar Anadolu SK, Nişantaşı SK, Topkapı İdman Yurdu SK, Darüşşafaka SK, İstiklal SK, Gürbüzler, Makrıköyspor, Kumkapı SK, Üsküdar, Türk İdman Ocağı SK, Fatih SK, Yenişafak SK, Kasımpaşa SK, Topkapı SK

References
 Tuncay, Bülent (2002). Galatasaray Tarihi. Yapı Kredi Yayınları 
 Dağlaroğlu, Rüştü. Fenerbahçe Spor Kulübü Tarihi 1907-1957

Istanbul Football League seasons
Turkey
Istanbul